Simunjan may refer to:

Simunjan District
Simunjan (federal constituency), formerly represented in the Dewan Rakyat (1971–90)
Simunjan (state constituency), represented in the Sarawak State Legislative Assembly